Silphini is a tribe of carrion beetles in the subfamily Silphinae. It contains the following genera:

 Ablattaria Reitter, 1884
 Aclypea Reitter, 1884
 Dendroxena Motschulsky, 1858
 Heterosilpha Portevin, 1926 
 Heterotemna Wollaston, 1864
 Necrophila Kirby & Spence, 1828
 Oiceoptoma Leach, 1815
 Oxelytrum Gistel, 1848
 Phosphuga Leach, 1817
 Ptomaphila Kirby & Spence, 1828
 Silpha Linnaeus, 1758
 Thanatophilus Leach, 1815
 Allopliosilpha Gersdorf, 1969
 Pliosilpha Gersdorf, 1970

References

Silphidae
Beetle tribes
Taxa named by Pierre André Latreille